This is a list of  coats of arms of Montenegro. Most municipalities of Montenegro have their own coat of arms. Many Montenegrin military units and other public agencies and some private families have coats of arms. There are also many historical Montenegrin coat of arms throughout history.

Montenegro

Historical coat of arms

Medieval Period

17th–20th Century

Late-20th Century

Municipalities of Montenegro

References

Montenegro-related lists
Montenegro